Dame Doris Alice Lucy Walkden Fitton,  (3 November 18972 April 1985) was an Australian actress of stage and film and theatrical director and producer who founded and for 35 years headed The Independent Theatre Ltd. in Sydney, New South Wales.

The Independent staged a diverse range of local and international dramas, many for the first time in Australia, in total during its tenure playing host to more than 400 productions including Gwen Meredith's, Shout at the Thunder, Sumner Locke Elliott's wartime comedy, Rusty Bugles and Max Afford's thriller Lady in Danger

Biography

Early life
Fitton was born in Santa Ana, Manila, Philippines, to English-born broker Walter Albert and Janet Frazer (née Cameron) Fitton. Her father died when she was young and in 1902, aged five, she relocated to Australia settling in Victoria with her mother and elder sister, Ethel. She was educated at Loreto Convent, Ballarat and took acting classes with Gregan McMahon. Fitton had her first acting role in Melbourne with J. C. Williamson in 1915.

In 1922 Fitton married law clerk Norbert Keck "Tug" Mason in Sydney, where they lived in Chatswood, New South Wales and Potts Point, New South Wales  before moving to Berry Street, North Sydney in 1953.

Theatre career
Fitton joined the Turret Theatre where she was secretary as well as performer.

She helped found The Independent Theatre  (known then simply as Independent Theatre) in St James' Hall in 1930, taking its name from the Independent Theatre Society founded in London by J. T. Grein. As the company developed, they progressively moved to better premises until in 1938 they took over the old Coliseum in Miller Street, North Sydney.

All told, The Independent Theatre staged more than 400 productions, including Sumner Locke Elliott's controversial Rusty Bugles, Max Afford's Lady in Danger and Gwen Meredith's Shout at the Thunder.

Doris Fitton was usually producer and director, and frequently acted in productions as a leading lady, and in each of these roles she won praise from the critics. With Doris's failing health, the Independent closed in May 1977. It was reopened in 1998, continuing its tradition as a training ground for young actors and playwrights.

Notable students and associates

John Appleton, stage and radio producer
Sumner Locke Elliott, stage producer and writer
John Alden, theatre entrepreneur
Ruth Cracknell, Australian actress
Reg Livermore, actor of stage and screen
Bud Tingwell, actor
Googie Withers, British entertainer

Honours
She gained public recognition for her commitment to theatre in Australia with her appointments as Officer of Order of the British Empire (OBE) in 1955, as Commander (CBE) in 1975, and as Dame Commander (DBE) in 1982.

Personal life
Doris and "Tug" Mason had two sons, Ewen Richard Cameron Mason (born 19 February 1925) and Malcolm John (born 26 July 1933).

In 1952 they were living at a three-storey flat in Pott's Point before moving to North Sydney in 1953. They then lived in a house in Berry St, North Sydney. This house was later demolished to make way for the Northern Expressway. They then moved to Ridge Street, North Sydney, around the corner from The Independent Theatre.

Death and legacy
Doris Fitton published her autobiography, Not Without Heat and Dust, in 1981. She died in North Sydney, on 2 April 1985, aged 87.

A commemorative plaque was unveiled on 17 December 1986 on the footpath in front of the Independent Theatre in her honour, with the famous stanza from William Shakespeare As You Like It: "All the world's a stage, And all the men and women merely players: They have their exits and their entrances..." 

Doris Fitton Park at 1 Little Walker Street, North Sydney, is named after her.

Sources

References

External links
 
 
 
 
  [CC-By-SA]

1897 births
1985 deaths
Australian film actresses
Australian stage actresses
Australian theatre directors
Australian Dames Commander of the Order of the British Empire
Actresses awarded damehoods
Actresses from Sydney
Australian people of English descent
People from Santa Ana, Manila
19th-century Australian women
20th-century Australian women
People educated at Loreto College, Victoria
Filipino emigrants to Australia